The Tulane National Primate Research Center (TNPRC) is a federally funded biomedical research facility affiliated with Tulane University. The TNPRC is one of seven National Primate Research Centers which conduct biomedical research on primates. The TNPRC is situated in 500 acres of land in Covington, Louisiana, and originally opened as the Delta Regional Primate Center in 1964. The center uses five types of non-human primates in its research: cynomolgus macaques, African green monkeys, mangabeys, pig-tailed macaques and rhesus macaques. The TNPRC employs over three hundred people and has an estimated economic impact of $70.1 million a year.

Research
The TNPRC has four divisions: Comparative Pathology, Microbiology, Immunology, and Veterinary Medicine. The center investigates diseases including HIV/AIDS, celiac disease, Krabbe disease, leukemia, Lyme disease, respiratory syncytial virus (RSV), rotavirus, tuberculosis, varicella zoster virus (VZV), and Zika virus.

Facilities
The TNPRC is located on 500 acres of land in Covington, Louisiana. In addition to its research facilities, the center has an on-site, 40,000 square foot Biosafety Level 3 biocontainment laboratory. The TNPRC also operates a large breeding colony of non-human primates.

Breeding Colony
The TNPRC operates an on-site breeding colony of 5,000 non-human primates.

Incidents and controversies
In 1998, two dozen rhesus macaques escaped from their cage into the surrounding area of the TNPRC.

In 2005, over 50 monkeys escaped from their cage into the surrounding area of the TNPRC. Four of the primates died or were never found.

In 2006, thirteen baboons were killed after being placed in a crowded chute.

In September 2012, a rhesus macaque was inadvertently left in an unattended vehicle for approximately 22 hours. As a result, the macaque was dehydrated and later died.

In September 2014, a USDA inspection report revealed that several of the animal cages had been kept in unclean and unsanitary conditions.

In November 2014, three macaques in the TNPRC's breeding colony were affected by a biosecurity breach due to staff members not following proper procedure. As a result, the animals were euthanized.

In September 2015, a USDA inspection revealed that personnel at the TNPRC were not following appropriate procedures regarding the criteria for euthanizing animals.

References

External links
TNPRC home page

Primate research centers
Animal testing on non-human primates
Tulane University
Medical research institutes in the United States
Biomedical research foundations
1964 establishments in Louisiana
Research institutes in Louisiana